A Holy Week procession is a public ritual march of clergy and penitents which takes place during Holy Week in Christian countries, especially those with a Catholic culture. Various images of the saints, especially the Virgin Mary, and most importantly the image of the crucified Christ are carried aloft by foot on shoulder-borne pasos (or on wheeled carrozas in the Philippines) as an act of penance; acts of mortification are carried out; traditional Christian hymns and chants are sung (except during the silent processions of Good Friday). In many confraternities of penitents, the faces of the members are covered by elaborate hoods, such as the capirote, as a way of hiding one's identity in order to not ostentatiously draw attention to oneself while performing penance. Crosses, and biers holding Catholic holy images surrounded with flowers and offerings of candles, are carried usually from one parish church to another led by the clergy, monastic orders, or heads of the penitential orders.

Holy Week processions

Palm Sunday: The day when Jesus arrived in Jerusalem.
Holy Thursday: The day when Jesus shared the Last Supper with His Apostles, followed by the beginning of his Passion.
Good Friday: Jesus' crucifixion, performed in 14 stations.
Holy Saturday: Loneliness of the Blessed Virgin Mary and the day that Jesus Christ's body lay in the tomb.
Easter Sunday: The resurrection of the Christ.

Local customs

Argentina
 La Boca, Buenos Aires, Salta, Cordoba, Mendoza, Neuquén

Colombia
Popayán, Santa Cruz de Mompox

Corsica
Calvi, Sartène (See Catenacciu )

Guatemala

Honduras
Comayagua, Tegucigalpa

Italy

Trapani, Taranto, Chieti, Sulmona,

Malta
Citadel (Gozo)
Cospicua
Għargħur
Għaxaq
Luqa
Mosta
Nadur
Naxxar
Paola
Qormi
Rabat
Valletta
Victoria (Gozo)
Vittoriosa
Xagħra (Gozo)
Xewkija (Gozo)
Żebbuġ
Żebbuġ, Gozo
Żejtun

Mexico

Peru
Arequipa, Ayacucho, Cusco, Huaraz, Tarma

Philippines

Portugal

Spain

Cuenca, declared of International Tourism Interest
Zagagoza, declared of international tourism interest
Jerez de la Frontera, declared of National Tourim Interest
Granada, declared of international tourism interest
Málaga  declared of international tourism interest
Seville,   declared of international tourism interest
León, declared of international tourism interest  
Salamanca, declared of international tourism interest
Valladolid, declared of international tourism interest 
Zamora, declared of international tourism interest
 Hellin, declared of international tourism interest 
Toledo, declared of international tourism interest
Murcia, declared of national tourism interest, the typical with Francisco Salzillo images.
Cartagena, declared of international tourism interest
Lorca, declared of international tourism interest
Ferrol, declared of international tourism interest in 2014

Venezuela
 Caracas, Maracaibo, Barquisimeto, Maturín

Noted sculptors of Holy Week pasos
Pedro Berruguete
Gil de Siloé
Juan de Juni
Francisco Salzillo
Juan de Mesa
Gregorio Fernández

See also
Triduum

References

External links

Holy Week in Taranto – Italy (in English - Spanish)
Holy Week in Lower Aragon
Holy Week in Nicaragua